E. lineatus  may refer to:
 Ecsenius lineatus, a blenny species from the Indo-West Pacific
 Euthynnus lineatus, the black skipjack, a fish species

See also
 Lineatus